Hazard pay or danger money (British English) is income in addition to regular wages given for performing work under hazardous or dangerous conditions. Hazardous work means that use of reasonable protective gear does not adequately mitigate the inherent risks involved in the work, wherein harm or death could result.

Current examples
In Detroit, Michigan the municipal government is paying certain public employees an additional amount of $800 per month to perform their jobs during the Coronavirus outbreak.

In the United States a group of federal employees from various agencies has filed a lawsuit to force the government to pay hazard pay during the COVID-19 pandemic.

References 

Labor rights
Wages and salaries
Working time